The UEFA European Under-18 Championship 1978 Final Tournament was held in Poland. It also served as the European qualification for the 1979 FIFA World Youth Championship.

Qualification

Group 1

Group 4

Other groups

|}

Teams
The following teams qualified for the tournament:

 
 
 
 
 
 
 
 
  (received Bye for qualifying stage)
  (host)

Squads

Group stage

Group A

Group B

Group C

Group D

Semifinals

Third place match

Final

Qualification to World Youth Championship
The six best performing teams qualified for the 1979 FIFA World Youth Championship: four semifinalists and the best group runners-up (based on goal difference). For an unknown reason, semifinalists Scotland did not participate.

External links
Results by RSSSF

UEFA European Under-19 Championship
1978
Under-18
1977–78 in Polish football
May 1978 sports events in Europe
Sports competitions in Kraków
1978 in youth association football
20th century in Kraków